Zedain House is an Art Nouveau-style building in Tsentralny City District of Novosibirsk, Russia, built in 1913. It is located at Kommunisticheskaya Street.

History
The house was built in 1912–1913 and belonged to the merchant P. M. Zedain.

See also
 Ikonnikova House
 Kryukov House

References

External links
 Новосибирские тайны: у домов есть глаза. НГС.АФИША.
 Жилой 2-этажный дом (дом жилой купца П.М. Зедайна). Новосибирский краеведческий портал.

Tsentralny City District, Novosibirsk
Buildings and structures in Novosibirsk
Residential buildings completed in 1913
Art Nouveau architecture in Russia
Cultural heritage monuments of regional significance in Novosibirsk Oblast